The Emanuel United Church of Christ, also known as Emanuel Reformed Church, is a historic United Church of Christ church building located at 329 E. Main St. in Lincolnton, Lincoln County, North Carolina.  It was designed by Henry E. Bonitz and built in 1913.  It is a rectangular Late Gothic Revival style red-orange brick church with a four-stage corner tower.  It features cast cement detailing, lancet arched windows, and buttresses with cement caps.

It was listed on the National Register of Historic Places in 1994.

References

United Church of Christ churches in North Carolina
Churches on the National Register of Historic Places in North Carolina
Gothic Revival church buildings in North Carolina
Churches completed in 1913
Churches in Lincoln County, North Carolina
National Register of Historic Places in Lincoln County, North Carolina
1913 establishments in North Carolina